The 22817 / 18 Howrah–Mysore  Express is a Superfast Express train belonging to Indian Railways South Eastern Railway zone that runs between  and  in India.

It operates as train number 22817 from Howrah Junction to Mysore Junction and as train number 22818 in the reverse direction, serving the states of West Bengal, Odisha, Andhra Pradesh, Tamil Nadu & Karnataka.

Coaches
The 22817 / 18 Howrah–Mysore Express has one AC 2-tier,  six AC 3-tier, 11 sleeper class, two general unreserved & two SLR (seating with luggage rake) coaches. It does not carry a pantry car.

As is customary with most train services in India, coach composition may be amended at the discretion of Indian Railways depending on demand.

Service

As the average speed of the train is above , as per railway rules, its fare includes a Superfast surcharge.

Routing

Schedule

Traction

References

External links
22817 Howrah–Mysore Express at India Rail Info
22818 Mysore–Howrah Express at India Rail Info

Express trains in India
Rail transport in Howrah
Rail transport in West Bengal
Rail transport in Odisha
Rail transport in Andhra Pradesh
Rail transport in Tamil Nadu
Rail transport in Karnataka
Transport in Mysore